The 2011 Mountain West Conference baseball tournament took place from May 24 through 28  The top six regular season finishers of the league's seven teams met in the double-elimination tournament held at San Diego State's Tony Gwynn Stadium.  Sixth seeded New Mexico won their first Mountain West Conference Baseball Championship with a championship game score of 4–2 and earned the conference's automatic bid to the 2011 NCAA Division I baseball tournament.

Seeding

The top six finishers from the regular season were seeded one through six based on conference winning percentage only.  Only six teams participate, so Air Force was not in the field.

Results

All-Tournament Team

References

Tournament
Mountain West Conference baseball tournament
Mountain West Conference baseball tournament
Mountain West Conference baseball tournament
Baseball competitions in San Diego
College baseball tournaments in California